Watford Football Club are an English football club, from Watford, Hertfordshire. Founded in 1881 as Watford Rovers, the club has competed in the Football League since 1920 and since the 2015–16 season have competed in the Premier League. First introduced by the Watford Observer in the 1972–73 season, the Watford F.C. Player of the Season award is voted for annually by supporters of the club. It recognises the best overall performance by an individual player through the season. Winners were originally presented with the Watford Observer Trophy, but since 2016–17 the award has been named the Graham Taylor Player of the Season Award, after the club's former manager.

Goalkeeper Andy Rankin won the initial award in the 1972–73 season, ahead of Colin Franks and Duncan Welbourne. In the 1974–75 season, Rankin won the award for the second time, becoming the first of ten players to do so as of 2016. Another goalkeeper, Tony Coton, is the only player to have received the title for a third time. Coton is one of four players to have won the award in consecutive seasons, the others being Wilf Rostron in 1982–83 and 1983–84, Tommy Smith in 2007–08 and 2008–09, and most recently, Troy Deeney in 2013–14 and 2014–15. Eight winners of the award have represented their country at full international level, of whom only John McClelland went on to become Watford's Player of the Season for a second time.

Towards the end of each season, fans vote directly for the Player of the Season. Historically this has been conducted by post, but in recent years it has taken place on the Watford Observer's website. This system was earmarked for change to a match-by-match rating system in 2009, but in March 2010, the Observer decided to revert to the traditional method of voting.

Winners

Statistics correct at end of 2018–19 season.

Statistics

Footnotes

References
General
 Players of the Season sourced to: 
 Pre-1998 player information sourced to: 
 Post-1998 player information sourced to: 
 Further information sourced in an individual player's notes section as necessary.

Further reading
 
 

Specific

 Player of the Season
Association football player of the year awards by club in England
Association football player non-biographical articles